Vic Duppa-Whyte (1934–1986) was a British paper engineer and author for pop-up books.

Born in Southern Africa, Duppa-Whyte moved to the United Kingdom before attending college.  After graduating from the Ealing Art College in London, he started designed promotional items and packaging for companies.

In 1969, Duppa-Whyte started creating children's books with pop-up inserts to fulfill a contract.  By 1983, he started concentrating on these books, producing them on the human body, the US Space Shuttle, Halley's Comet, and the British Royal family. Duppa-Whyte also taught three dimensional art at Kingston Polytechnic in London.

Duppa-Whyte died in 1986 in South America.

Influence
Paper engineer David A. Carter recalled his friendship with Duppa-Whyte, “...while I was in London, I spent some time with him in his studio. He showed me all of his work and we talked a lot...He was another John Strejan-type paper engineer...Vic would show me things off the shelf and the paper engineering was just incredible – the things he would make happen. He was working on The War of the Worlds, which has never been published, but he actually had the spaceship floating in the air. It had a couple of little tiny pieces supporting it, but it was floating in the air. It was just incredible! "

Paper engineer Graham Brown once noted his favorite paper engineer was Duppa-Whyte, “...I worked with [him] on The Legend of King Arthur and the Round Table. I enjoyed the collaboration greatly because he was a brilliant paper engineer and a very laid-back guy. Unfortunately, he died before it was completed.... In my opinion he was probably the most original and creative paper engineer around."

Selected biography
Ann Montanaro’s reference book, Pop-Up and Movable Books, lists more than a dozen pop-up books by Duppa-White.

Collection
The Vic Duppa-Whyte, paper engineer, papers, ca.1940 – 1986, are held at the Archive of Art and Design, Victoria & Albert Museum., ca. 500 files.

Exhibitions

References

External links
Worldcat Identities: Vic Duppa-Whyte

British writers
Children's books
Pop-up book artists
1934 births
1986 deaths
Academics of Kingston University